Syringa villosa, the villous lilac, is a shrub native to Korea, the southern part of the Russian Far East (Primorye) and northern China. There are two subspecies currently recognized (April 2014); these are regarded as separate species in Flora of China. Combining the ranges for the two taxa yields a range within China of Hebei, Shanxi, Heilongjiang, Jilin, and Liaoning.

Syringa villosa is a shrub up to 4 m tall, with red, white, pink or purple flowers.

Subspecies

Syringa villosa subsp. villosa
Syringa villosa subsp. wolfii (C.K.Schneid.) Jin Y.Chen & D.Y.Hong - (syn. Syringa wolfii C.K.Schneid.)

References

villosa
Plants described in 1804
Flora of China
Flora of Russia
Flora of Korea
Flora of Hebei
Flora of Shanxi
Flora of Heilongjiang
Flora of Jilin
Flora of Liaoning
Garden plants
Shrubs
Taxa named by Martin Vahl